Chan Siu Kwong (born 30 May 1966), also known as Brian Chan, is a Hong Kong former badminton player. He competed at the 1992 Summer Olympics and the 1996 Summer Olympics.

References

External links
 

1966 births
Living people
Hong Kong male badminton players
Olympic badminton players of Hong Kong
Badminton players at the 1992 Summer Olympics
Badminton players at the 1996 Summer Olympics
Place of birth missing (living people)
Commonwealth Games medallists in badminton
Commonwealth Games bronze medallists for Hong Kong
Badminton players at the 1990 Commonwealth Games
Medallists at the 1990 Commonwealth Games
Medallists at the 1994 Commonwealth Games